Tracey Neuls is a shoe designer; founder of TN29 and the eponymous Tracey Neuls labels. Neuls produced her first commercial collection in 2000 after winning the New Generation Prize at London Fashion Week.

Neuls has a shop in Marylebone Lane, London – listed in 2012 as one of Time Outs London Top 100 – which was followed by a second in Redchurch Street in 2011.

Neuls was shortlisted for the Drapers Footwear and Accessories Award 2013 (Footwear Designer of the Year category) and in 2012 was named one of the Time Out/The Hospital Club's Culture 100. In 2014 her BIKE GEEK design was short listed as one of the Design Museum's Designs of the Year

Shoes designed by Neuls are referenced in the Peter James novel Dead Like You  and the Judy Astley novel The Look of Love.

Collaborations
Neuls has collaborated with many creative individuals and groups over the past 15 years.
 Tokyobike
 Art Car Boot Fair
 Tord Boontje
 Fabergé Big Egg Hunt
 LE GUN
 Faudet-Harrison
 The Museum Of Everything
 Nicola Yeoman
 Nina Saunders & Sanderson
 Moroso
 Tim Ellis
 Design Is Simply Complex
 The Wapping Project
 Brompton Shop & Show
 Elaine Avila
 Retrouvius
 Boo Ritson

External links
  Tracey Neuls official site

References

Canadian women artists
Year of birth missing (living people)
Living people